La Argentina may refer to:

 La Argentina (dancer) (1890–1936), Argentine dancer
 La Argentina, Huila, a town and municipality in the Huila Department, Colombia
 La Argentina (poem), a 1602 poem by Martín del Barco Centenera
 La Argentina, a sail frigate used by the Argentine corsair Hippolyte Bouchard in his campaign 1817-19
 Several other ships of the Argentine Navy have been named either La Argentina or ARA La Argentina, among them
 ARA La Argentina (C-3), a light cruiser of the Argentine Navy commissioned in 1939
 ARA La Argentina (D-11), a MEKO-360 type destroyer of the Argentine Navy commissioned in 1983

See also
 Argentina
 Argentina (disambiguation)